Broad Dyke is an original dyke in the United States built by the Dutch in 1655 in New Castle, Delaware. It is the center of the twelve mile circle that forms the arc that marks the northern state line (between Delaware and Pennsylvania). It was surveyed in 1701 by Empson and Pusey.

External links
"New Castle County Historical Markers - Broad Dyke"
Delaware State Historical Markers Links to all official markers categorized by county.

Buildings and structures in New Castle County, Delaware
Dikes in the United States
Dutch-American culture in Delaware
Buildings and structures completed in 1655
1655 establishments in the Dutch Empire